The Ryukyu long-tailed giant rat or Ryukyu rat (Diplothrix legata) is a species of rodent in the family Muridae. It is the only extant species in the genus Diplothrix. It is found only in the Ryukyu Islands of Japan. Its natural habitat is temperate forests.

Conservation
The species is threatened by habitat loss, predation by feral cats (with studies finding that the rat contributed 23% of feral cat's diet on Amami-Oshima), and introduced nematode and helminth parasites.

References

External links 

Muridae
Rats of Asia
Endemic mammals of Japan
Endemic fauna of the Ryukyu Islands
Mammals described in 1906
Taxa named by Oldfield Thomas
Taxonomy articles created by Polbot